Lieutenant-Colonel Sir Ralph Verney, 1st Baronet, CB, CIE, CVO (25 May 1879 – 22 February 1959) was a British Army officer who served as Military Secretary to the Viceroy of India and Secretary to the Speaker of the House of Commons.

The son of Frederick Verney MP, Ralph Verney was educated at Harrow School and Christ Church, Oxford. He joined the Rifle Brigade in 1900 and served in the Second Boer War.

References

External links 

 

Knights Bachelor
1959 deaths
Companions of the Order of the Bath
Companions of the Order of the Indian Empire
Commanders of the Royal Victorian Order
People educated at Harrow School
Alumni of Christ Church, Oxford
Rifle Brigade officers
Baronets in the Baronetage of the United Kingdom